Sun Yue (born 19 June 1972) is a Chinese singer. She first became known for her 1994 hit single Zhu Ni Ping'an (祝你平安; "Wishing You Well").

Discography
Albums:
1995 Xīnqíng bùcuò
1996 Huǒbàn
1997 Wèile zhè yītiān xīngē +jīngxuǎn
1998 Hǎorén hǎo mèng
1998 Huānlè zhōngguó nián
1999 Kuàilè zhǐnán
2000 Dàjiā yì qǐlái xīngē +jīngxuǎn
2000 Zěnmó HAPPY
2002 Bǎihé huā 
2004 Tā hé tāmen 
2006 Xìngfú shālòu
2010 12th Album, 3 vols.
2022 Sunny time

References

1972 births
Chinese Mandopop singers
Musicians from Harbin
Singers from Heilongjiang
Living people
20th-century Chinese women singers
21st-century Chinese women singers